Kurir is daily tabloid newspaper published in Belgrade, Serbia.

History
Kurir first issue appeared at the news stands on 6 May 2003. While Kurir's history is relatively short, it is also a checkered one. It goes back to the state of emergency, declared following the assassination of Serbia's Prime Minister Zoran Đinđić, when another daily tabloid named Nacional was shut down.

Using its broad powers under the state of emergency act, Serbian government's Ministry of Culture and Information headed by Branislav Lečić issued a temporary ban on publication of Nacional daily on 18 March 2003 for "publishing a number of articles relating to the state of emergency and for questioning the reasons behind the state of emergency". Then on 1 April 2003, the Belgrade city commercial court started liquidation proceedings against Nacional'''s publisher in Belgrade, Info Orfej. Despite an appeal, the company's equipment, including 118 computers, was seized on 21 April 2003, two days before the state of emergency ended.

Many of the former Nacional staffers found employment in newly formed Kurir, including Dragan J. Vučićević (founder of Informer), ex Nacional deputy-editor-in-chief who took the same post at Kurir. New paper bore an uncanny resemblance to the old one, both in tone and layout. This led many critics to conclude that Kurir continued where Nacional left off. In addition to Kurir, another similar daily tabloid Balkan attempted to move into the void left by Nacional's ban. Even the original Nacional sort of reappeared – under the same financial backing, new staff, and a new name Internacional. However, neither publication could keep up commercially. Balkan folded in early 2005 while Internacional changed its name to Srpski nacional along with a format makeover.

Many credit Kurir for providing the final nudge to Prime Minister Zoran Živković's shaky government, in effect forcing it to call early elections for 28 December 2003. Throughout fall of 2003, Kurir ran stories of dodgy voting practices in Serbian parliament and blasted the ruling coalition (DOS) MP Neda Arneric for misusing her parliamentary voting rights.

They also wrote to no end about Minister of the Interior Dušan Mihajlović's alleged shady deals done through his own Lutra company. Sources that supplied Kurir with all this insider info appear to be members of G17 Plus which led some observers to accuse this party's leadership of deliberate character-assassination by feeding information to a tabloid they knew would publish anything.Kurir'', for their part quickly turned on G17 too, as soon as they came into power. Tabloid wrote about their party's president (and since March 2004 deputy PM) Miroljub Labus' conflict of interest in arranging for his daughter to get a scholarship through Ericsson company while later taking part in negotiations between that corporation with state-owned Telekom Srbija.

Later, they turned on National Bank of Serbia governor Radovan Jelašić (also from G17 plus). The issue was his plush villa in the elite Belgrade suburb of Dedinje that governor said he bought for 350,000 euros. Kurir on the other hand claimed it could not have cost under million and a half and finally even found a buyer who offered Jelasic a million for the house. This buyer was, it turned out, business tycoon Bogoljub Karic which was strong opponent of G17 plus policies, and during this period Kurir was heavily influenced by Bogoljub Karic.

Kurir info Ltd, become a leader publishing house in daily newspapers, digital and custom publishing business in Serbia and the West Balkans region.

Editorial history
 Đoko Kesić (2003–2005)
 Antonije Kovačević (2005–2007)
 Đuro Bilbija (2007–2008)
 Rade Jerinić (2008–2010)
 Jovica Krtinić (2010–2011)
 Branislav Bjelica (2011–2012)
 Saša Milovanović (2012–2014)
 Milan Lađević (2014–2015)
 Ratko Femić (2015–2016)
 Nemanja Pajić (2016–2018)
 Aleksandar Đondović (since 2018)

See also
 List of newspapers in Serbia
 Media in Serbia

References

External links
Official Page

Newspapers published in Serbia
Publications established in 2003
Mass media in Belgrade